Léa Villiot (born 11 February 1997) is a French ice hockey player for Diables Rouges de Briançon and the French national team.

She represented France at the 2019 IIHF Women's World Championship.

References

External links

1997 births
Living people
French women's ice hockey defencemen
People from Briançon
Sportspeople from Hautes-Alpes